James Daniels (born September 13, 1997) is an American football guard for the Pittsburgh Steelers  of the National Football League (NFL). He played college football at Iowa.

Early years
Daniels attended Harding High School in Warren, Ohio and was a three year starter for the varsity football team. Along with football, he also participated in track. He committed to play football for the Iowa Hawkeyes in July 2014, choosing the Hawkeyes over schools such as Alabama, Auburn, and Ohio State among others.

College career
Daniels played center at Iowa from 2015 to 2017. After his junior season in 2017, he chose to forgo his senior season and enter the 2018 NFL Draft. He played in 37 games for the Hawkeyes over three years.

Professional career

Chicago Bears
Daniels was drafted by the Chicago Bears in the second round, 39th overall, of the 2018 NFL Draft.

Eric Kush started the 2018 season at left guard, though Daniels was slowly integrated into the role by splitting time with Kush as the year progressed. On October 28, he became the starter at the position against the New York Jets after Kush suffered a neck injury. He started 10 games as a rookie, nine at left guard and one at right guard.

Before the 2019 season, Daniels was moved to center, with then-incumbent center Cody Whitehair shifting to left guard. In November, with the Bears' offense struggling and right guard Kyle Long being placed on injured reserve, Daniels returned to left guard.

In the fifth game of the 2020 season against the Tampa Bay Buccaneers, Daniels suffered a season-ending pectoral muscle tear. He was placed on injured reserve on October 14.

Pittsburgh Steelers
On March 17, 2022, Daniels signed a three-year, $26.5 million contract with the Pittsburgh Steelers.

Personal life
Daniels is the younger brother of running back LeShun Daniels, who was his teammate at Iowa, and was signed by the New England Patriots as an undrafted free agent in 2017.

References

External links
Chicago Bears bio
Iowa bio

1997 births
Living people
Sportspeople from Warren, Ohio
Players of American football from Ohio
American football centers
American football offensive guards
Iowa Hawkeyes football players
Chicago Bears players
Pittsburgh Steelers players